Kaynarca is a neighbourhood in the Pendik district of Istanbul, Turkey. The current headman of Kaynarca is Birol Okay. Kaynarca, lies between the counties Pendik and Tuzla.

Districtness candidacy of Kaynarca
Pendik's population increased from 370,000 to 520,000 and Pendik was not divided in the last New Districts Law of Istanbul. The district of Sultanbeyli and Ümraniye was divided into many districts. Kaynarca has put its candidacy to be a district (Turkish: ilçe) of Istanbul. Even, most of the population of Pendik stems from Kaynarca. The famous parts of Kaynarca that makes the candidacy stronger is: 
 The biggest state hospital of Turkey (Pendik Education and Research Hospital) has been constructed in Kaynarca. 
 The Formula 1 place (Istanbul Park) is in Kaynarca.
 The State's SSK Hospital is in Kaynarca.
 Turkey's biggest arsenal is in Kaynarca. Turkey's most modern warship (Milgem F-511 TCG Heybeliada) has been constructing in Kaynarca.
 Istanbul's 5-star hotels are in Kaynarca (Green Park Hotel and Şahsuvaroğlu Hotel).
 Sabiha Gökçen International Airport, the second airport of Istanbul is in Kaynarca.
 Kadıköy - Kaynarca metro system's last station is Kaynarca.

References

External links
 Google map of Kaynarca
 Road map of Kaynarca neighbourhood

Neighbourhoods of Pendik
Populated places in Istanbul Province